The Huizen transmitter was one of the first large-scale radio transmitting stations to be built in the Netherlands.

History 
It was opened in 1923 as an experimental 500-watt transmitter, and its power was increased to 5000 watts in 1926.

The original Huizen transmitter towers were well-known local landmarks, frequently depicted on postcards. In 1935, however, they were demolished following the erection of a mast radiator near Hilversum.

In 1937 what were possibly the world's first rotating shortwave transmission antennas were erected at Huizen, consisting of two wooden 60-metre high towers. They were demolished in 1940 by retreating Dutch troops during the German invasion of the Netherlands. A replica of the shortwave antennas today stands on a traffic roundabout in Huizen.

References

External links 
 https://www.flickr.com/photos/47603290@N00/291683123/
 http://www.terras.tv/pages/tvmuseum/tvmuseumantennes/antennes02.html
 http://www.terras.tv/pages/tvmuseum/tvmuseumnsf/nsf02.html

Broadcast transmitters
Communication towers in the Netherlands
Huizen
Demolished buildings and structures in the Netherlands
Buildings and structures demolished in 1940
Towers in North Holland